Thomas Henry Wilkes (19 May 1874 – 1921) was an English footballer who played in the Football League for Aston Villa and Stoke.

Career
Wilkes was born in Alcester and played amateur football with Redditch Town before joining Aston Villa in 1894. Wilkes enjoyed a considerable amount of success at Villa, winning the English league title on three occasions as well as earning two FA Cup victories. The best season he enjoyed was in 1895–96 as he only missed once match of Villa's title-winning season. However, he lost his place to Billy George; Wilkes subsequently went on loan to Stoke towards the end of the 1897–98 season.

Stoke were struggling at the bottom of the First Division before Wilkes joined; when he became a part of the team and played in the final five matches of the season, Stoke went unbeaten. It mattered little, however, as Stoke still finished bottom on goal average after finishing level on points with four teams. They had to play the end-of-season test matches against the best teams in the Second Division in order to stay up. In the final match against Burnley, both teams went into the match knowing that a draw would see them remain in the First Division, and throughout the 90 minutes, not a single attempt on goal was made; this led to the introduction of automatic promotion and relegation.

Wilkes returned to Villa at the end of the season and played four matches in 1898–99 before he rejoined Stoke on a permanent basis in 1899. He played four seasons for Stoke before retiring in 1903. He later owned the Wharf Tavern in Stoke.

Career statistics
Source:

Honours
 Aston Villa
Football League First Division champion: 1895–96, 1896–97, 1898–99
FA Cup winner: 1894–95, 1896–97

References

External links
 Stoke were in safe hands thanks to keeper Wilkes at thisisstaffordshire.co.uk

1874 births
1921 deaths
People from Alcester
English footballers
Association football goalkeepers
Redditch United F.C. players
Aston Villa F.C. players
Stoke City F.C. players
English Football League players
FA Cup Final players